The 1980 E3 Prijs Vlaanderen was the 23rd edition of the E3 Prijs Vlaanderen cycle race and was held on 22 March 1980. The race started and finished in Harelbeke. The race was won by Jan Raas of the TI–Raleigh team.

General classification

References

1980 in Belgian sport
1980